Rosalind Amelia Young (13 August 1853 – 1 February 1924) was a historian from Pitcairn Islands.

Early life 
Young was born in 1853 on Pitcairn Island to Simon Young and Mary Buffett Christian.

As a young child she was part of a migration to Norfolk Island but returned in 1864. Her father led the return of several families to the Pitcairn Islands and became magistrate in 1849.

Career 
From a young age she began recording the history of the Pitcairn Islands, specifically that of Elizabeth Mills, daughter of a Bounty mutineer. She shared the history of the islands through letters, collecting historical information and personal stories. She also began writing articles about the islands and worked as a primary schoolteacher.

In 1894 she published a comprehensive history of Pitcairn Islands in the book Mutiny of the Bounty and Story of Pitcairn Island (1790–1894). Since its original publication, the book has been reprinted several times. The book is one of the few documentations of the islands' history and drew upon the direct experiences of several generations of islanders, including those of HMS Bounty.

Young was also a poet and composed the words to several songs which are still played on Pitcairn Islands.

Legacy 
In 2017, five stamps were created in her honour, as part of the 'Prominent Pitcairners' series, and were on sale from 22 February 2017 (for a period of two years).

Personal life 
Young married Pastor David Nield, a New Zealander, on 27 November 1907 in Auckland, New Zealand. She died on 1 February 1924 on Pitcairn Island.

References 
  

1853 births
1924 deaths
Pitcairn Islands people
Pitcairn Islands people of English descent
Women historians
19th-century women writers
19th-century historians
20th-century women writers
20th-century historians